Andermann syndrome, also known as agenesis of corpus callosum with neuronopathy (ACCPN) and Charlevoix disease, among other names, is a very rare neurodegenerative genetic disorder that damages the nerves used to control muscles and related to sensation and is often associated with agenesis of the corpus collosum.

It was first described by Eva Andermann et al. in 1972.

Symptoms and signs 
Symptoms begin in infancy and include:
 hypotonia
 areflexia
 amyotrophy
 variable degrees of dysgenesis of the corpus callosum
 mild to severe intellectual and developmental delay
 psychiatric problems including paranoid delusions, depression, hallucinations and autistic-like behavior

Genetics 
The inheritance pattern is autosomal recessive. Several genes have been associated with the disorder, including SLC12A6.

Neuropathology
Autopsy examination of eight cases has shown both developmental and degenerative neuropathologic features in this disease, consistent with clinical duality as both a neurodevelopmental and neurodegenerative disorder.

In the central nervous system, accompanying the hypotonia at birth is hypoplasia of the corticospinal tracts. Another developmental feature is seen in the corpus callosum, which varies from absent to hypoplastic. The anterior commissure is almost always absent, but occasionally hypoplastic. A bundle of Probst can be found running anteroposterior rather than crossing the midline. The axonal damage due to the channel deficiency can cause a reactive axonal overgrowth leading to small, tumor-like growths, or tumorlets, called axonomas, or balls of aberrant axons. Damaged axons can also show a sign of inhibition of axonal transport, forming axonal spheroids. These spheroids can occur throughout the cerebral hemispheres, explaining the psychotic symptoms by disconnection of the brain from itself by axonal functional disruption.

In the peripheral nervous system (PNS), the disease is more severe. While most nervous system diseases affect either central nervous system (CNS) or PNS, this disease affects both, but the changes in the PNS lead to death. This occurs by axonal disease paralyzing the skeletal muscles, including the respiratory muscles, as a result of axonal damage in peripheral nerves. Changes in the axons are more severe in the PNS than CNS, and under the electron microscope, some axons look necrotic, by virtue of containing mitochondrial flocculent densities and other irreversible changes. The lack of innervation of the body musculature during development gives rise to small body weights, often below , remarkable in view of the preserved brain weights.

Diagnosis
A typical diagnostic workup includes:
 Clinical features
 Electrophysiologic testing
 Molecular genetic testing (SLC12A6)
 Magnetic resonance imaging of the brain (revealing in 60% of the patients callosal agenesis and in 10% partial callosal agenesis)

Treatment 
Currently, no cure is known, but some symptoms may be treated, such as neuroleptics for the psychiatric problems.

Prognosis 
The prognosis is poor. Patients are usually wheelchair bound by their 20s and die by their 30s.

Prevalence 
The prevalence rate has been estimated to be less than one per 1,000,000 worldwide, and is much more common in the French-Canadian population of the Saguenay and Lac-St-Jean regions of Quebec, Canada, where it has a frequency of about one in 2100 in live births, and a carrier rate of one in 23.

References

External links 
 Andermann syndrome at OMIM
 Andermann syndrome at Orpha.net
 Andermann syndrome at GARD

Genetic diseases and disorders
Syndromes affecting the nervous system